Thelwall is a village in Warrington, England.

Thelwall may also refer to:

People
Algernon Thelwall (1795–1863), English clergyman
Eubule Thelwall (disambiguation)
John Thelwall (1764–1834), British writer
Lumley Thelwall, Welsh politician
Simon Thelwall (disambiguation)
Sydney Thelwall (1834–1922), English clergyman
Thomas de Thelwall (died 1382), English judge and Crown official
William Thelwall Thomas (1865–1927), Welsh surgeon

Other uses
Thelwall Viaduct, on the M6 motorway in England

See also
Thelwell, a surname